Omega Pharma was a Belgian-based pharmaceutical company which was acquired in 2014 by Perrigo Company plc, an Irish/United States-based global pharmaceutical public company. The company was founded in 1987 and was based in the Industrial area 'de Prijkels' in Nazareth.

History 
The company was founded in 1987 by Marc Coucke and Yvan Vindevogel, both former pharmacy students at the Ghent University. They each had a 50% share in the company. Their first product was a shampoo in 5 liter bottles which they sold to pharmacists who then added a customised scent and colour to sell the product as a homemade brand. In 1989 they started selling Uvesol tanning lotions. In 1994 Yvan Vindevogel sold his shares to Marc Coucke.

in 1998 was the company's initial public offering (IPO). Omega Pharmaa was initially listed as a Naamloze vennootschap on the Euronext Brussels and used to be part of the BEL20 index until late 2011 when Coucke (through his investment company Couckinvest) and private equity firm Waterland took the company private once again. Omega Pharma was officially acquired by Perrigo with effect from 31 March 2015. The company is now part of the Branded Consumer Healthcare division within Perrigo.

Between 2012 and 2014, Omega Pharma, together with Quick Step, was a corporate sponsor of the Omega Pharma–Quick-Step UCI World Tour cycling team.

Arseus

At the annual shareholders meeting of Omega Pharma held on 6 June 2006, it was announced that the company's professional health division would operate under the name of Arseus. Simultaneously, the management team of Arseus was presented. The legal structure of the entities in this division has been largely prepared in the meantime, so that the project to make Arseus an autonomous company is on schedule. Arseus became effectively an independent entity via an IPO on 5 October 2007 and has been listed on NYSE Euronext Brussels and NYSE Euronext Amsterdam since then.

Brands 
 Bergasol (tanning products)
 Biodermal
 Biover (natural Healthcare products: vitamines, minerals, supplements, aromatherapy)
 Bodysol (hypoallergenic bodycare)
 Bronchostop Duo (cough)
 Calmanax
 Cremicort 
 Davitamon (Multi-vitamine supplements)
 Dermalex (skincare for regular skin or specific skin diseases)
 Dynarax
 Eau Précieuse 
 Galenco (hypoallergenic skincare for babies and young children)
 Kaliptus
 Lactacyd (female intimate hygiene)
 Naaprep
 Opticalmax
 Paranix (anti-lice)
 Physiomer (Nasal sprays made of purified seawater)
 Phytosun (Aromatherapy and essential oil)
 Predictor (pregnancy test)
 Prevalin
 T. LeClerc (cosmetics)
 Vitafytea (fytotherapy)
 XL-S Medical (weightloss)
 XLS Cure (weightloss)
 Wartner (warts removal at home)
 Ymea (reduces symptoms of the menopause)
 Yokebe (diet protein shakes)
 Zaffranax (uplifting supplement treatment for depressed people)
 Zaffranpure
 Zincotabs (zinc)

References

External links

Official website of Omega Pharma Corporate (In English or Dutch, no longer updated)
Official website of Perrigo

Dental companies
Pharmaceutical companies of Belgium
Pharmaceutical companies established in 1987
1987 establishments in Belgium
Pharmaceutical companies disestablished in 2014
2014 mergers and acquisitions
Companies based in East Flanders
Nazareth, Belgium